A pilgrimage to a statue of Mary in Werl, North Rhine-Westphalia, Germany, caused the building of pilgrimage churches there. The first one, completed in 1662, was replaced by a Baroque building completed in 1789, which later became known as the Alte Wallfahrtskirche (Old Pilgrimage Church). When it became too small, an adjacent Wallfahrtsbasilika (Pilgrimage Basilica) was built, dedicated to the Visitation (Mariä Heimsuchung). It was declared a Basilica minor in 1953.

History 
A pilgrimage to a miraculous image of Mary (wundertätiges Marienbild) in Werl began in 1661. The  is a wood-carved figure of Mary with her son on her lap, dated to the 12th century. An abbey church of the Order of Friars Minor Capuchin, designed by a friar Bonitus from Trier and completed in 1662, became unstable and was demolished. A larger church was built instead to accommodate the rising numbers of pilgrims.

Wallfahrtskirche 
The pilgrimage church (Wallfahrtskirche), which also served as an abbey church for the friars (Kapuzinerkirche), was designed by Franz Arnold Matthias Boner and built from 1786 to 1789, as a hall church in Baroque style with five bays and a rectangular choir. The interior is cross-vaulted and features high windows. Uniform interior furnishings date from the late 17th century.  The church was dedicated to Mary (Mariae Virginis).

The building was expanded to the east from 1859 to 1860. The choir was changed to a five-sided choir, and the church was equipped with a ridge turret. In 1953, the colour scheme of the carvings was unified.

Wallfahrtsbasilika 

When the Baroque church became too small for the growing number of pilgrims, an adjacent Wallfahrtsbasilika was created. It was built from 1904 to 1906, designed by Wilhelm Sunder-Plaßmann in Romanesque Revival style. The builder also worked for the Münster Cathedral. He used Rüthener Grünsandstein, a local sandstone, for a building dominated by two high steeples in the west. The basilica was consecrated, dedicated to the Visitation (Mariä Heimsuchung), on 24 May 1911 by Karl Joseph Schulte, Bishop of Paderborn. It was declared a Basilica minor on 16 October 1953 by Pope Pius XII.

Literature 
 Anton Henze et al.: Reclams Kunstführer Deutschland, Bd. 3: Rheinlande und Westfalen. Baudenkmäler. Reclam, Stuttgart 1975, p. 730.
 Georg Dehio, Ursula Quednau: Handbuch der deutschen Kunstdenkmäler, Nordrhein-Westfalen, Band 2: Westfalen. Deutscher Kunstverlag, Berlin 2011, p. 1168
 , Hans Jürgen Zacher (eds.): Werl. Geschichte einer westfälischen Stadt, Bd. 1 in: Studien und Quellen zur westfälischen Geschichte. Bd. 31 Teil 1. Bonifatius Verlag, Paderborn 1994, .

References

External links 

 
 Pilgerziele im Erzbistum Paderborn  Diocese of Paderborn 

1662 establishments in the Holy Roman Empire
Baroque architecture in North Rhine-Westphalia
Baroque church buildings in Germany
Pilgrimage churches in Germany
Roman Catholic churches completed in 1906
Roman Catholic churches completed in the 1680s
Romanesque Revival church buildings in Germany
17th-century Roman Catholic church buildings in Austria